Carol Duvall is host of the long-running The Carol Duvall Show which began on the HGTV network and later broadcast on the DIY Network.

Her television career began on a children's show in Grand Rapids, Michigan in 1951. A local radio station bought a television station and she and a friend decided to go and audition.  The station liked what they had to offer and Duvall was hired. By the end of the first year, she was doing seventeen live shows a week. In 1962 the manager of the station moved to WWJ-TV in Detroit and hired Duvall to work there. She spent 18 years in a variety of positions, ranging from news anchor to co-producer and host of her first craft-oriented program, "Here's Carol Duvall".

One day she received a call from a man she had met when he was still an intern in Cleveland. He was putting together a new show called the Home Show and they needed a craft person.  The show was picked up by ABC and ran for six years.

When the Home Show came to an end in 1994, the host Robb Weller formed a production company with Gary Grossman which developed The Carol Duvall Show.  The program ran on HGTV from 1994 until 2005, then on DIY Network from 2005 until the end of 2009.

Duvall attended Michigan State University where she was a member of Alpha Chi Omega sorority.

Publications

 Wanna Make Something Out of It? (1972), Nash Publishing 
 Paper Crafting with Carol Duvall (2007),  DRG Publishing 
 Art Unscripted, An artist retreat hosted by Carol Duvall (2008) DVD, directed by Suzanne Lamar

Filmography

 Home (1988–1994)
 The Carol Duvall Show (1994–2005)
 Carol Duvall's Holiday Workshop (2001)

References

External links
 HGTV shows
 Interview with Carol Duvall at Girlfriendology

American television personalities
American women television personalities
Living people
Year of birth missing (living people)